The Durrānī, formerly known as Abdālī, are one of the largest tribes of Pashtuns. Their traditional homeland is in southern Afghanistan (Loy Kandahar region), straddling into Toba Achakzai in Balochistan, Pakistan, but they are also settled in other parts of Afghanistan and parts of Khyber Pakhtunkhwa in Pakistan.

Ahmad Shah Durrani, who is considered the founder of the modern state of Afghanistan, belonged to the Abdali tribe. In 1747, after establishing the Durrani Empire based in Kandahar, he adopted the epithet Shāh Durr-i-Durrān, "King, Pearl of Pearls," and changed the name of the tribe to "Durrani" after himself.

Descent and origin 

In the early modern period, the Abdali tribe of Pashtuns was first explicitly mentioned in Mughal and Safavid sources. For example, in the 1595 Mughal account Ain-i-Akbari, the Abdali were mentioned as one of the "Afghan ulūs" (Pashtun tribal confederacies) settled in Kandahar area, along with Tarīn, Paṇī, and Kākaṛ. Some scholars have postulated that the Abdali descended from Hephthalite tribes, who settled in present-day Afghanistan in ancient times and were known as ηβοδαλο (Ebodalo) in Bactrian language.
According to linguist Georg Morgenstierne, the tribal name Abdālī may have "something to do with" the Hephthalite. This hypothesis was endorsed by historian Aydogdy Kurbanov, who indicated that after the collapse of the Hephthalite confederacy, they likely assimilated into different local populations and that the Abdali may be one of the tribes of Hephthalite origin. 19th-century British Indian explorers, Charles Masson and Henry W. Bellew, also suggested that there was a direct relationship between Abdalis and Hephthalites.
Joseph T. Arlinghaus referred to a Syriac chronicle from c. 555 CE, which mentions Khulas, Abdel, and Ephthalite as three of the nomadic tribes from the "lands of the Huns." Arlinghaus linked the "Khulas" and the "Abdel" to the Khalaj (modern Ghilji) and the Abdali (modern Durrani), respectively, arguing that the relationship between the Hephthalite, the Khalaj, and the Abdali may date back as far as the sixth century.
Yu. V. Gankovsky, a Soviet historian on Afghanistan, also asserted that the Hephthalite contributed to the ethnogenesis of Durrani Pashtuns:

Mythical genealogy
According to a popular mythical genealogy, recorded by 17th-century Mughal courtier Nimat Allah al-Harawi in his book Tārīkh-i Khān Jahānī wa Makhzan-i Afghānī, the Abdali tribe descended from their eponymous ancestor Abdāl (or Awdāl), who was son of Tarīn, who was son of Sharkhbūn, who was son of Saṛban (progenitor of the Sarbani tribal confederacy), who was son of Qais Abdur Rashid (progenitor of all Pashtuns). Qais Abdur Rashid was a descendant of Afghana, who was described as a grandson of the Israelite king Saul and commander-in-chief of the army of prophet Solomon. Qais was claimed to be a contemporary of the Islamic prophet Muhammad and a kinsman of Arab commander Khalid ibn al-Walid. When Khalid ibn al-Walid summoned Qais from Ghor to Medina, Qais accepted Islam and the prophet renamed him Abdur Rashīd (meaning "Servant of the Guide to the Right Path" or "Servant of God" in Arabic). Abdur Rashid returned to Ghor and introduced Islam there. The book stated that Abdur Rashid's great-grandson, Tarīn, had three sons: "One was black in complexion, and he was named Tōr (meaning "black" in Pashto); the other was white in complexion, and he was named Spīn (meaning "white" in Pashto); his third son was named Abdāl (or Awdāl)." The first two sons were the progenitors of modern Tareens, who are closely related to Durranis and are divided into two clans (Tor Tareen and Spin Tareen), while the third son was the progenitor of modern Durranis.
The 1595 Mughal account Ain-i-Akbari also mentioned the tradition of Israelite descent among Pashtuns, which shows that the tradition was already popular among 16th-century Pashtuns.

History
During the 16th and 17th centuries, the Abdali were primarily pastoralists, not known for agricultural activities, but some of them were engaged in overland trade. Abdali and Tarin (a Pashtun tribe related to Abdalis) chieftains were patronized by both Safavid and Mughal appointed governors, and asked to patrol travel routes to ensure the safety of merchant caravans passing through Kandahar, which was a province located on a strategic trade corridor linking Hindustan, Iran, and Turkestan.

Hotak dynasty

The first Ghilji Emir of the Hotak dynasty, Mirwais Hotak (1709–1715), was married to Khanzada Sadozai, daughter of Abdali chief Jafar Khan Sadozai. This cemented a Ghilji-Abdali alliance that played an integral role in Mirwais' rise to political authority in Kandahar and in the successful revolt against the Safavids. A product of the marriage, Mahmud Hotak, conquered Iran in 1722, and the Iranian city of Isfahan remained the dynasty's capital for six years.

During the Hotak rule, an Abdali contingent went to Herat to assume control of the province, replacing the former Safavid appointed governors. Zaman Khan Abdali, father of Ahmad Shah Durrani, was one of the Abdali governors of Herat.

Durrani Empire

In 1747, Ahmad Shah Durrani established the Durrani Empire with its capital at Kandahar. He adopted the title Shāh Durr-i-Durrān, "King, Pearl of Pearls," and changed the name of his tribe "Abdali" to "Durrani" after himself.

Ahmad Shah is now regarded as the founder of the modern state of Afghanistan. Within a few years, he extended his control from Khorasan in the west to Kashmir and North India in the east, and from the Amu Darya in the north to the Arabian Sea in the south.

Barakzai dynasty

In 1823, Emir Dost Mohammad Khan, who belonged to the Barakzai tribe of Durranis, founded the Barakzai dynasty centered at Kabul. Thereafter, his descendants ruled in direct succession until 1929 when King Amanullah Khan, under whom Afghanistan gained independence over its foreign policy from the British Raj, was forced to abdicate and his cousin Mohammed Nadir Shah was later elected king. The Barakzai dynasty ruled present-day Afghanistan until 1973 when Mohammed Zahir Shah, the last Barakzai king, was overthrown in a bloodless coup by his cousin Mohammed Daoud Khan. The coup ended the Barakzai kingdom and established the Republic of Afghanistan (1973—1978).

Contemporary period

Contemporarily, the former Afghan president Hamid Karzai (2001–2014), like Ahmad Shah Durrani, also belongs to the Popalzai clan of Durranis.

The current leader of the Taliban - Hibatullah Akhundzada is a member of Nurzai Panjpai.

Pashto dialect

Although many are bilingual in Dari Persian, the Durrani of southern Afghanistan speak Southern Pashto, also known as "Kandahari Pashto", the "soft" dialect of Pashto. It is considered one of the most prestigious varieties of Pashto.

The Tareen (Tarin) tribe is historically closely related to Durranis. Although most Tareens speak Southern Pashto, a small section of the Spin clan of Tareens living east of Quetta speaks the unique Wanetsi (Tareeno) dialect of Pashto, which is considered by some linguists to be distinctive enough to be classified as its own language. According to linguist Prods Oktor Skjaervo: "The Pashto area split into two dialect groups at a pre-literary period, represented today on the one hand by all the dialects of modern Pashto and on the other by Wanetsi and by archaic remains in other southeast dialects."

Subtribes 
Achakzai
Alakozai
Badozai
Barakzai
Miana
Bamozai
Nawabi
Barech
Ghoryakhel
Khalil
Daulatyar
Daulatzai
Chamkani
Mattezai
Mohmand
Halimzai
Daudzai
Mulagori
Hazarbuz
Bayazidkhel
Shilmani
Zakhil
Zeerani
Zakhilwal
Khawezai
Hanbhi
Ishaqzai
Kiral
Loni
Mohammadzai
Nurzai
Panjpai
Alizai
Popalzai
Habibzai
Sadozai
Sudhan
Wazirzada
Zirak

Notes
 In Pashto, "Durrani" ([durɑˈni]) is the plural form of the word. Its masculine singular is "Durranai" ([durɑˈnay]), while its feminine singular is "Durraney" ([durɑˈnəy]).

See also
Ghilji
Yusufzai
Kakar

References

Further reading
 
 
 
 

Durrani Empire
Ethnic groups in Afghanistan
Social groups of Pakistan
 
Sarbani Pashtun tribes
Pashto dialects

ca:Durrani